"Heave Away" (also Heave Away, My Johnny) is a traditional sea shanty, with origins unknown.

History
The earliest print version of the song is from a collection of Cecil Sharp in 1904 from Captain Vickery of Minehead, Somerset, England. 

The song was described by American folklorist Kenneth S. Goldstein as, "A favourite shanty for windlass work, when the ship was being warped out of harbour at the start of a trip."

Recordings
In 1957, it was recorded as "Heave Away, My Johnny" by English folk singers A. L. Lloyd and Ewan MacColl on their album of whaling ballads and songs, Thar She Blows.

In 1964, English folk singer Lou Killen sang "Heave Away My Johnny" in 1964 on the Topic anthology of sea songs and shanties, Farewell Nancy.

In 1968, it was recorded as "Heave Away My Johnny" by Irish folk group The Clancy Brothers and Tommy Makem on their album of sea songs, Sing of the Sea. 

In 1997, it was recorded as "Come Get Your Duds In Order (Heave Away)" by Canadian Celtic rock group The Punters on their second album "Said She Couldn't Dance".  

In 1998, it was recorded as "Heave Away" by Canadian Celtic rock group The Fables on their debut album Tear the House Down. The Fables version has enjoyed continued popularity in their home province of Newfoundland and Labrador and in Atlantic Canada in general, with Canada using it as their goal song during the 2023 World Junior Ice Hockey Championships in Halifax, Nova Scotia. The song had previously been used the Toronto Maple Leafs in the mid-2000s as their goal song.

In 2014, it was recorded as "Heave Away" by Canadian folk group, The Bombadils, https://thebombadils.com, on their album "Grassy Roads, Wandering Feet", https://www.youtube.com/watch?v=Rk6V26GvrQk&ab_channel=TheBombadils-Topic, live version: https://www.youtube.com/watch?v=sJe-plrgKFM&ab_channel=TheBombadils. This version can also be heard as the soundtrack for the animated Lego video by Hamster Productions, "LEGO Pirate Sea Battle - The Barracuda Heist", https://www.youtube.com/watch?v=DmrkUntwNBw&ab_channel=HamsterProductions

See also
 List of Newfoundland songs

References

English folk songs
Canadian folk songs
Newfoundland and Labrador folk songs
Year of song unknown